James McLaren (12 July 1897 – 16 November 1975) was a Scottish professional footballer. He played as a goalkeeper.

Career 
Born in Falkirk, Stirlingshire, McLaren was Scotland's goalkeeper in their first ever schools international match, against England.

During his senior career, McLaren played in Scottish football for Bonnybridge Heatherbell and Stenhousemuir, initially in the Central League. His last season at Stenhousemuir was 1921–22, the club's first ever season in the Scottish Football League. In May 1922 McLaren transferred to English club Bradford City. He played for them for five seasons, before spending a further six at fellow Football League club Leicester City.

McLaren joined Watford in October 1933, aged 36. Under the management of Neil McBain and latterly Bill Findlay, he made 194 appearances in the Third Division South, 14 in the FA Cup and 18 in the Third Division South Cup. Prior to McLaren's arrival, Watford's best finish in the division was sixth place. By contrast, during McLaren's five full seasons at the club, Watford finished fourth three times, fifth once and sixth once. Aged 40, McLaren kept goal as Watford won the 1937 Third Division South Cup.

McLaren died in Leicester on 16 November 1975, aged 78.

References 

1897 births
1975 deaths
Footballers from Falkirk
Scottish footballers
Stenhousemuir F.C. players
Bradford City A.F.C. players
Leicester City F.C. players
Watford F.C. players
Association football goalkeepers
Scottish Football League players
English Football League players
Scotland youth international footballers